William Desmond may refer to:

 William Desmond (politician) (died 1941), Irish Cumann na nGaedheal and Fine Gael party politician
 William Desmond (actor) (1878–1949), Irish-born American actor
 William Desmond (philosopher), Irish philosopher

See also